Taynyashevo (Taynaş) is a rural locality (a selo) in Chekmagushevsky District, Bashkortostan, Russia. The population was 487 as of 2010. There are 6 streets.

Geography 
Taynyashevo is located 23 km northwest of Chekmagush (the district's administrative centre) by road. Starobalakovo is the nearest rural locality.

References 

Rural localities in Chekmagushevsky District